William Wynn or William Wynne may refer to:

William Wynne (historian) (c. 1671–1704), priest and historian
William Wynne (MP for Caernarvon), (1678–1754), MP for Caernarvon, 1749-1754
William Wynne (lawyer) (c. 1692–1765), lawyer and writer
William Wynn (poet) (c. 1709–1760), Welsh priest and poet
William Wynne (judge) (1729–1815), English lawyer, Dean of Arches and Master of Trinity Hall, Cambridge
William Wynne (Irish politician) (c 1764–1855), Irish politician, MP for Sligo Borough 1799–1800
William Watkin Edward Wynne (1801–1880), MP for Merionethshire (1852–1865) and antiquarian
William J. Wynn (1860–1935), Member of the US House of Representatives from California
William Andrew Wynne (1869–1951), baseball pitcher, played one Major League game for the Washington Senators
William Wynn (footballer) (1876–1944), Shrewsbury Town F.C. and Wales international footballer
William Robert Maurice Wynne (died 1909), MP for Merionethshire 1865–1868
Will Wynn (American football) (born 1949), defensive end for the Philadelphia Eagles and the Washington Redskins
Will Wynn (born 1961), Mayor of Austin, Texas
William Wynne (athlete) (born 1990), American hurdler
William H. Wynn, trade unionist and first president of the United Food and Commercial Workers International Union 
Bill Wynne, American author and dog trainer